HMS Foam was a two funnel, 30 knot destroyer ordered by the Royal Navy under the 1894 – 1895 Naval Estimates.  She served in the Mediterranean for most of her short career and was sold in 1914, 4 months before the beginning of World War I.

Construction
Ordered on 10 May 1895, she was laid down as yard number 307 on 16 July 1895 at the John I Thornycroft and Company shipyard at Chiswick on the River Thames. She was launched on 8 October 1896. She was completed and accepted by the Royal Navy in July 1897. During her acceptance trials and work ups her average sea speed was 25 knots.

Pre-War
On 26 June 1897 she was present at the Royal Naval Review at Spithead in celebration of Queen Victoria's Diamond Jubilee. Rudyard Kipling visited her in May 1897, and what he learnt on board was put to good use in his poem "The Destroyers". Foam was deployed to the Mediterranean Fleet in the second half of 1897 and remained there for most of her career. Lieutenant Stanley Venn Ellis was appointed in command on 24 March 1902. In September 1902 she visited Nauplia with other ships of the fleet. She returned to Home waters in 1913.

On 30 August 1912 the Admiralty directed all destroyer classes were to be designated by letters, starting with the letter 'A'.  Since her design speed was 30-knots and she had two funnels she was assigned to the D class.  After 30 September 1913, she was known as a D-class destroyer and had the letter ‘D’ painted on the hull below the bridge area and on either the fore or aft funnel.

Fate
As part of the progressive modernization of the Royal Navy, Foam was sold on 26 May 1914 at Chatham and scrapped in Norway.

References

Bibliography
 
 
 
 
 
 
 
 
 

 

Ships built in Chiswick
1896 ships
D-class destroyers (1913)
Ships built by John I. Thornycroft & Company